Ogulagha Kingdom (Ogula) is a  riverine, izon and oil producing kingdom in the Burutu LGA of Delta State, Nigeria. It is located 33.3 miles from Warri. Main occupation is fishing, hunting and farming. In Ogulagha Kingdom the wet season is warm and overcast, while the drier season is mostly hot and cloudy.

The kingdom lies in an oil-producing area, with operations by Shell Petroleum Development Company (SPDC), Nigeria Agip Oil Company (NAOC), and other companies. Allegations of corruption and unfair distribution of oil royalties have led to local conflict, and opposition to the federal government.

The area is susceptible to flooding and erosion. In 2021, it was reported that housing had been lost as a result of degradation of a 24-year-old seawall.

Education 
Ogulagha Kingdom have so many Primary and Secondary schools both in the Government and Private sector, Ogulagha Kingdom presently have a Jamb center which is located in Ogulagha Community the headquarter of the Kingdom.

In 2021 a computer-based testing centre in Ogulagha was trialled for hosting exams for the Joint Admission Matriculation Board (JAMB). Previously, JAMB candidates from the Delta area needed to travel inland to sit exams.

Religion 
Christianity is the most practiced Religion, Ogulagha kingdom have about 60 Christian Churches, Some natives still practice African traditional religion, which has been practiced for thousands of years before the arrival of the Europeans to Africa.

This is evident in the several ancestral shrines that can still be seen in the Kingdom. A critical appraisal of the belief system of the average Ogulagha indigene will reveal a combination of both Christian and pagan leanings.

Muslims are in the Kingdom too but are much of Non-Indigene such as Hausas, Youruba and few other People.

Communities 

 Ogulagha Community, The Headquarters of the Kingdom
 Sokebolou Community 
 Obotobo 1 Community 
 Obotobo 2 Community 
 Youbebe Community 
 Obuguru (Agip) Community 
 Youkiri Community 
 Osain Community 
 Abara Community 
 Okuntu Community

Etymology 
The Etymology of the word Ogulagha means 'A place were war will not occur or transpire' and the name was accorded due to the high level of peace in the Kingdom.

Notable people 

 Julius Gbabojor Pondi, Nigerian politician
 Joseph I. Timiyan, traditional ruler
 Chief Princess Caroline Ene [JP], The Bolou-ere of Ogulagha Kingdom 
 HRM S.S Ene; Obukoware 1 (Abadebini) former king (pere) of Ogulagha Kingdom

See also 
 Burutu 
 Forcados 
 Ijaw people

References 

Delta State